'Plantarum seu stirpium historia' is an illustrated botanical text by the Flemish physician Lobelius (Matthias de l'Obel (1538–1616) and published in Antwerp in 1576. Later, he translated it into Flemish in 1581 with the title Kruydtboeck. This was l'Obel's second work, following publication of the Stirpium adversaria nova in London in 1570. This work was intended as a companion publication to his Stirpium adversaria nova, and incorporates a revised version of the latter, as Nova stirpium adversaria.

History 

L'Obel's first work was the Stirpium aduersaria noua, published in London in 1571. The Plantarum seu stirpium historia of 1576 was intended as a companion piece, and was published in conjunction with a re-issue of Stirpium aduersaria noua, as Nova stirpium adversaria In 1571 l'Obel published his Flemish translation of Plantarum, as Kruydtboeck (Herb book), and in 1605 he reissued the Stirpium.

The Plantarum deals with several subjects, including descriptions and illustrations (more than 2,000) of plants known to l'Obel, with plant names given in Latin, German, English, French, Flemish, Italian, and Spanish. It also includes a history of botany and the use of plants in treating diseases. It was published by Christophe Plantin, whose workshop handled most of the major botanical works of the period and accumulated a large stock of woodcuts which were recycled between all these publications. The work is notable as one of the earliest attempts to classify plants by their natural characteristics rather than medicinal properties. Once Kruydtboeck was published, Plantin issued the engravings as a separate album, arranged according to L'Obel's classification.

Structure 

The initial section is the new Stirpium observations (671 pages), which is liberally illustrated, followed by the revised Nova stirpium adversarial. The former contains 1,473 woodcuts. While many of these were reused from other botanical works, principally L'Écluse, about half were original to this publication. In addition to the Nova stirpium, the work includes a work by Guillaume Rondolet, Lobel's mentor at the University of Montpellier. This is a 15-page publication entitled Formulae Aliquot Remediorum, Guillielmi Rondelletii, libro de internet remedies omissae.

Contents 

L'Obel's classification of plants, outlined in this work, rested primarily on the structure of the leaves leading him to be one of the earlier botanists distinguishing monocotyledons from dicotyledons.

Notes

References

Bibliography

Works by l'Obel 

  - Also available as  
 Reissued as:
  including Rondelet's Formulae remediorum, to be appended as a companion volume to his Plantarum, seu, Stirpium historia of the same year.

Other

External links 

Botany books
Herbals
History of botany